Belapur railway station may refer to:
Belapur (BAP) railway station, Ahmednagar district, Maharashtra, India  
CBD Belapur railway station, Mumbai, India